Lance Haidet (born December 23, 1997) is an American cyclist, who currently rides for UCI Continental team .

Major results

Cyclo-cross

2013–2014
 2nd Deschutes Brewery Cup Juniors
 2nd Cincy3 Lionhearts International – Cross After Dark Juniors
2014–2015
 1st CXLA Weekend - Day 2 Juniors
 1st Junior Derby City Cup 1
 2nd Junior Derby City Cup 2
 5th Pan American Junior Championships
2015–2016
 2nd CXLA Weekend 1 & 2
 3rd Highlander 'Cross Cup Day 2
2016–2017
 1st  National Under-23 Championships
 3rd CXLA Weekend - Day 1 & 2
2017–2018
 1st West Sacramento Cyclocross Grand Prix Day 2
 2nd CXLA Weekend: Cyclocross Los Angeles Day 1 & 2
 2nd West Sacramento Cyclocross Grand Prix Day 1
2018–2019
 1st RenoCross
 2nd Cincinnati UCI Cyclocross - Kingswood Park Day 1
 2nd US Open of Cyclocross Day 1
2019–2020
 1st US Open of Cyclocross Day 1
 1st Ruts 'n' Guts 2
 2nd Ruts 'n' Guts 1
 2nd Cincinnati UCI Cyclocross - Kingswood Park Day 1
 2nd FayetteCross Day 1
 3rd US Open of Cyclocross Day 2
2021–2022
 3rd GO Cross Day 2
 3rd Really Rad Festival of Cyclocross Day 1

Road
2019
 1st  Road race, National Under-23 Road Championships

References

External links

1997 births
Living people
American male cyclists
Cyclists from Oregon
Sportspeople from Bend, Oregon
Cyclo-cross cyclists